Thomas Jake Stewart (born 2 October 1999, in Coventry) is a British racing cyclist, who currently rides for UCI WorldTeam . Stewart was initially due to join the team for the 2021 season – having signed a two-year contract in August 2020 – but he was promoted from the  early, making his début at Gent–Wevelgem.

Major results

Road

2016
 3rd Overall Junior Tour of Wales
2017
 5th Road race, UCI World Junior Championships
2018
 2nd Kattekoers
 3rd Trofeo Piva
2019
 3rd Road race, National Under-23 Championships
 3rd Ronde van Vlaanderen Beloften
 3rd Eschborn–Frankfurt Under-23
 5th Overall Le Triptyque des Monts et Châteaux
 8th Paris–Roubaix Espoirs
2020
 2nd Overall Tour de Limousin
1st  Young rider classification
2021
 2nd Omloop Het Nieuwsblad
 4th Overall Étoile de Bessèges
1st  Young rider classification
 6th Nokere Koerse
2022
 1st Stage 1 Tour de l'Ain
 3rd Overall Four Days of Dunkirk
1st  Young rider classification
 3rd Grand Prix du Morbihan
 6th Overall Boucles de la Mayenne
1st  Young rider classification
 8th Overall Tour of Britain
 8th Binche–Chimay–Binche

Grand Tour general classification results timeline

Track

2016
 3rd Madison (with Fred Wright), National Championships
2017
 1st  Madison (with Rhys Britton), National Junior Championships
 2nd Madison (with Joe Holt), National Championships
 UEC European Junior Championships
2nd  Team pursuit
3rd  Madison (with Rhys Britton)
2018
 1st  Team pursuit, National Championships

Notes

References

External links

1999 births
Living people
British male cyclists
English male cyclists
Sportspeople from Coventry
English track cyclists
Cyclists at the 2022 Commonwealth Games